Antiphanes (Ancient Greek: Ἀντιφάνης; c. 408 to 334 BCE) was a playwright of Middle Comedy.  According to Heinz-Günther Nesselrath, he is regarded as one of the most important writers of Middle Comedy alongside Alexis.

Antiphanes was said to have written as many as 365 comedies, and 140 titles of his works are known. His first play was produced about 385 BC.  According to the Suda, he won 13 victories in dramatic competitions, including 8 at the Lenaea.  In his later career he was a pioneer of the New Comedy.  Demetrius of Phalerum and Dorotheus of Ascalon wrote treatises on Antiphanes.

His son, Stephanus, was also a comic writer.

Surviving titles and fragments

 Adelphai ("Sisters")
 Adonis
 Agroikos ("The Country-Dweller")
 Akestria
 Akontizomene ("Woman Shot With an Arrow")
 Aleiptria ("The Female Oiler, or Masseuse")
 Alkestis ("Alcestis")
 Antaios ("Antaeus")
 Anteia
 Anasozomenoi  ("The Rescued Men")
 Aphrodites Gonai ("Aphrodite's Birth" )
 Archestrate
 Archon
 Argyriou Aphanismos  ("Disappearance of Money")
 Arkas ("Man from Arcadia")
 Arpazomene  ("The Seized, or Captured, Woman")
 Asklepios ("Asclepius")
 Asotoi ("Debauched Men")
 Auletes ("Male Flute-Player")
 Auletris ("Female Flute-Player"), or Didymai ("Twin Sisters")
 Autou Eron
 Bakchai ("Bacchae")
 Batalos
 Boiotis ("The Woman From Boeotia")
 Bombylios
 Bousiris ("Busiris")
 Boutalion
 Byzantios ("The Man From Byzantium")
 Cyclops
 Chrysis
 Gamos  ("Marriage")
 Ganymedes ("Ganymede")
 Glaukos ("Glaucus")
 Gorgythos
 Diplasia ("Female Double")
 Dodonis ("The Woman From Dodona")
 Drapetagogos ("Catcher of Runaway Slaves")
 Dyserotes ("People With Disastrous Love-Lives")
 Dyspratos ("The Hard-To-Sell Slave")
 Ephesia ("The Woman From Ephesus")
 Epidaurios ("The Man From Epidaurus")
 Epikleros ("The Heiress")
 Euploia ("A Pleasant Voyage")
 Euthydikos
 Halieuomene  ("Woman Caught Like A Fish")
 Heniochos ("The Charioteer")
 Hippeis ("Knights")
 Homoioi ("People Who Resemble Each Other")
 Homonymoi  ("People With The Same Name")
 Homopatrioi ("People With The Same Father")
 Hydria  ("The Water-Pitcher")
 Hypnos  ("Sleep")
 Iatros ("The Physician")
 Kaineus ("Caeneus")
 Kares  ("Men From Caria")
 Karine ("The Woman From Caria")
 Kepouros ("The Gardener")
 Kitharistes ("The Harpist")
 Kitharodos ("The Citharode")
 Kleophanes
 Knapheus  ("The Fuller")
 Knoithideus, or Gastron ("Glutton")
 Korinthia ("The Woman From Corinth")
 Koroplathos ("Modeller of Clay Figures")
 Korykos
 Kouris ("The Female Hair-Dresser")
 Kybeutai ("Dice-Players")
 Lampas  ("The Torch")
 Lampon
 Lemniai  ("Women From Lemnos")
 Leonides
 Leptiniskos
 Leukadios ("The Man From Leucas")
 Lydos  ("The Man From Lydia")
 Medeia  ("Medea")
 Melanion
 Meleagros ("Meleager")
 Melitta ("The Bee")
 Metoikos ("Resident Alien")
 Metragyrtes ("Beggar-Priest of Cybele")
 Metrophon
 Midon
 Minos ("Minos")
 Misoponeros ("Hater of Wickedness")
 Mnemata  ("The Tombs")
 Moichoi  ("Adulterers")
 Mylon  ("The Mill")
 Mystis  ("Woman Initiated Into the Mysteries")
 Obrimos
 Oinomaos, or Pelops
 Oionistes  ("The Omen-Reader")
 Omphale ("Omphale")
 Orpheus ("Orpheus")
 Paiderastes ("The Pederast")
 Parasitos  ("The Parasite")
 Paroimiai ("Proverbs")
 Phaon ("Phaon")
 Philetairos ("Philetaerus")
 Philoktetes ("Philoctetes")
 Philometor ("Mother-Lover")
 Philopator ("Father-Lover")
 Philotis
 Phrearrhios
 Plousioi  ("Rich Men")
 Poiesis  ("Poetry")
 Pontikos  ("Man From Pontus")
 Probateus  ("The Sheep-Rancher")
 Problema ("Problem," or "Riddle")
 Progonoi  ("Ancestors")
 Pyraunos
 Sappho
 Skleriai  ("Difficulties," or "Hardships")
 Skythai ("Scythians"), or Tauroi ("Bulls")
 Stratiotes ("The Soldier"), or Tychon
 Thamyras
 Timon
 Traumatias ("The Wounded Man")
 Tritagonistes
 Tyrrhenus
 Zakynthios ("The Man From Zakynthos")
 Zographos  ("The Painter")

Notes

400s BC births
334 BC deaths
Ancient Greek dramatists and playwrights
4th-century BC Athenians
4th-century BC writers
Middle Comic poets
4th-century BC poets